Mekor Chaim (also Makor Haim, lit. Source of life) is a neighborhood in southwest Jerusalem. It was named for Haim Cohen, a wealthy Jewish businessman who donated large sums of money toward the purchase of land in Jerusalem before World War I.

History

The funds donated to Hovevei Zion by Haim Cohen were transferred to the Jewish National Fund, which purchased 120 dunams of land on the southern fringes of Jerusalem. Mekor Chaim was established in 1926 by the religious Zionist Mizrahi movement. It was planned as a village of 20 small farmsteads, and was built along one main street which developed parallel to the railway line. Each family received a two-dunam plot for a house, garden and orchard. In the early days, the families had cow sheds and chicken coops. The building contractor, Mar Haim, was head of the first neighborhood committee. He arranged for the Hamekasher bus company to open a regular route between Mekor Chaim and the city center. Initially, there was one central water tap in the south of the neighborhood. The committee purchased the water from the municipality and placed a watchman at the tap to count how many buckets each family drew. Later, raised water cisterns were built in the garden of each home. During the Arab riots of 1929, the residents took shelter in the synagogue, which was built like a fortress.

According to a census conducted in 1931 by the British Mandate authorities, Mekor Chaim had a population of 202 inhabitants, in 41 houses.

Located between the Arab villages of Malha and Beit Safafa, and far from other Jewish neighborhoods, Mekor Chaim was exposed to Arab sniping and endured a lengthy siege that began in December 1947. Convoys of supplies from Talpiot to Mekor Chaim were turned back by the British Army. In the 1948 war, the Haganah was stationed there and it was the site of fierce battles.

After the Six-Day War, the Talpiot industrial zone was developed, ending the neighborhood's isolation. In the mid-1980s, the Jerusalem city council established zoning laws to stop the encroachment of commerce and preserve the residential character of Mekor Chaim. The Israel State Archives is located in the neighborhood.

Education
The Sudbury Democratic School is located in Mekor Chaim.

References

Neighbourhoods of Jerusalem